The Skipper's Wooing is a 1922 British silent comedy film directed by Manning Haynes and starring Gordon Hopkirk, Cynthia Murtagh and Johnny Butt.

Cast
 Gordon Hopkirk as The Skipper 
 Cynthia Murtagh as Annie Getting 
 Johnny Butt as Sam  
 Thomas Marriott as Dick  
 Bobbie Rudd as The Child  
 Jeff Barlow as Mr. Dunn

References

Bibliography
 Murphy, Robert. Directors in British and Irish Cinema: A Reference Companion. British Film Institute, 2006.

External links

1922 films
British silent feature films
British comedy films
Films based on works by W. W. Jacobs
Films directed by H. Manning Haynes
British black-and-white films
Films based on British novels
1922 comedy films
1920s English-language films
1920s British films
Silent comedy films